Mahmud ibn Ali ibn Naziri known by his pen name Hijri and his title Dede/Dade (1881 - 11 December 1952) was an  Iraqi Turkmen poet and writer.
Born in Kirkuk and grew up into a Kakaie family and taught by them. He started working as teacher in his hometown and in Baghdad. In 1927, he was assigned to manage Jaridat al Karkuk, after which he was appointed health inspector in the municipality department in 1928.
He died in his hometown. He wrote primarily in Turkish, but also wrote in Persian and Kurdish. He has worked in translation and history writing as well.
The poet was usually quite secretive about his religious beliefs and practices: when asked by outsiders, he would often claim to be Orthodox Sunni or, sometimes, Twelver Shi'a. According to some sources, Hijri Dede died in 1952.

References 

1952 deaths
People from Kirkuk
19th-century poets of Ottoman Iraq
20th-century Iraqi poets
Persian-language poets
Iraqi Turkish poets
Iraqi translators
Iraqi schoolteachers
Iraqi multilingual poets
1881 births
20th-century translators
Iraqi Yarsanis